Douglas Jabs is an American ophthalmologist and an expert in clinical research in the fields of ophthalmology and uveitis.

Jabs is currently the Chief Executive Officer of the Mount Sinai Faculty Practice Associates, Dean for Clinical Affairs, and Professor and Chair of the Department of Ophthalmology and Professor of Medicine of The Mount Sinai School of Medicine in New York City.  Additionally, he is adjunct Professor of Epidemiology at the Johns Hopkins Bloomberg School of Public Health in Baltimore, Maryland.

He is the author or co–author of over 230 publications, 45 books chapters and 86 published abstracts.

Biography

Jabs graduated valedictorian from Dartmouth College in 1973 with a degree in chemistry. He received his medical degree from Johns Hopkins School of Medicine in 1977, and MBA degree from Johns Hopkins University's Carey Business School in 1998. He completed an internship in internal medicine at New York Hospital–Cornell Medical Center, a residency in internal medicine at The Johns Hopkins Hospital and a residency in ophthalmology at the Wilmer Eye Institute, and a rheumatology fellowship at Johns Hopkins.

Jabs joined the faculty at the Johns Hopkins School of Medicine in 1984 as Assistant Professor. He was named Associate Professor of Ophthalmology in 1988, and Associate Professor of Medicine in 1989. In 1993 he was named Professor of both Ophthalmology and Medicine, and in 2000 he was named Professor of Epidemiology at the Bloomberg School of Public Health. In 2007, he was named Professor and Chair of the Department of Ophthalmology at The Mount Sinai Medical Center. In 2009, he was chosen as the Chief Executive Officer of the Mount Sinai Faculty Practice Associates and Dean for Clinical Affairs of the Mount Sinai School of Medicine.

Jabs currently chairs both the Study of Ocular Complications of AIDS (SOCA) Research Group and the Multicenter Uveitis Steroid Treatment (MUST) Trial. He has chaired five randomized, controlled, clinical trials on the treatment of CMV retinitis and now chairs a multicenter epidemiologic study investigating the long–term outcomes of patients with ocular complications of AIDS, particularly CMV retinitis. Jabs has been instrumental in leading the Standardization of Uveitis (SUN) project, an effort to standardize terminology and outcomes related to uveitis. He has served on numerous data and safety monitoring committees for clinical trials, both those sponsored by the National Institutes of Health and the pharmaceutical industry.

Jabs has been on the editorial board of The Journal of Retinal and Vitreous Diseases, Ocular Immunology and Inflammation, American Journal of Ophthalmology, and Ophthalmic Epidemiology.

He is the recipient of many awards including the Research to Prevent Blindness Olga Keith Weiss Scholar Award, Research to Prevent Blindness Lew R. Wasserman Merit Award, Research to Prevent Blindness Senior Scientific Investigator, American Academy of Ophthalmology Senior Achievement Award, Clinical Uveitis Research Award from the German Uveitis Patient Interest Group, EyeCare America, Lifetime Volunteer Physician Award, and European Uveitis Patient Interest Association (EUPIA) Uveitis Award.

Publications

References

External links
Mount Sinai Hospital homepage
Mount Sinai School of Medicine homepage

American medical academics
American ophthalmologists
Dartmouth College alumni
Johns Hopkins Carey Business School alumni
Living people
Icahn School of Medicine at Mount Sinai faculty
Year of birth missing (living people)
Johns Hopkins School of Medicine alumni